Mariah Millen (born June 29, 1998) is a Canadian sailor in the 49er FX class with partner Alexandra Ten Hove.

Career
In 2019, Millen and Alexandra Ten Hove competed at the 2019 Pan American Games, finishing in fourth place, and qualified Canada an entry for the event at the 2020 Summer Olympics in Tokyo.

In February 2020, the pair finished in 18th place at the World Championships, their highest placement in the event.

In March 2021, Millen was named to Canada's 2020 Olympic team with her partner Alexandra Ten Hove.

References

External links
 

1998 births
Living people
Canadian female sailors (sport)
Olympic sailors of Canada
Sailors at the 2020 Summer Olympics – 49er FX
Sailors at the 2019 Pan American Games
Sportspeople from Toronto